The 2013 Chadian coup d'état attempt was an attempted coup d'état against Chadian President Idriss Déby that was foiled on May 1, 2013. Clashes in military barracks east of the capital N'Djamena, as well as in residential area in the capital occurred on afternoon of May 1st, during the clashes in military barracks between 4 and 8 people were killed. Moussa Tao Mahamat, a former rebel leader, was accused of being the leader of the coup d'état attempt. He was arrested on the day coup was foiled. Four MPs, two generals, one journalists and several members of military were arrested on charges of participating in the coup.

References 

Chadian coup d'état attempt
Political history of Chad
Coup d'état attempt
Chad
Attempted coups d'état in Chad
Military history of Chad
Military coups in Chad
Chadian coup d'état attempt